The 1998 Australian Touring Car season was the 39th year of touring car racing in Australia since the first runnings of the Australian Touring Car Championship and the fore-runner of the present day Bathurst 1000, the Armstrong 500.

Two major touring car categories raced in Australia during 1998, V8 Supercar and Super Touring. Between them there were 23 touring car race meetings held during 1998; a ten-round series for V8 Supercars, the 1998 Australian Touring Car Championship (ATCC); an eight-round series for Super Touring, the 1998 Australian Super Touring Championship (ASTC); support programme events at the 1998 Australian Grand Prix and 1998 Honda Indy 300 and three stand alone long distance races, nicknamed 'enduros'.

Results and standings

Race calendar
The 1998 Australian touring car season consisted of 23 events.

Australian Touring Car Championship

Super Touring GT-P Race
This meeting was a support event of the 1998 Australian Grand Prix. The thin Super Touring field was bolstered by cars from the Australian GT-Production Car Championship (indicated in italics).

TAC V8 Supercar Showdown
This meeting was a support event of the 1998 Australian Grand Prix.

Australian Super Touring Championship

Tickford 500

AMP Bathurst 1000

Hog's Breath V8 Supercar Challenge
This meeting was a support event of the 1998 Honda Indy 300.

FAI 1000 Classic

References

Additional references can be found in linked event/series reports.

External links
 Official V8 Supercar site
 1998 Racing Results Archive

Australian Touring Car Championship
Supercar seasons
Touring Cars